Andreas Kemper (born April 11, 1963) is a German sociologist and author specializing in Classism.

Life

He was born into a working-class family and started to study philosophy, sociology and pedagogy first at the University of Münster, then the Free University of Berlin and completed his Master's degree at the University of Münster. His research interest is classism and he has published the first introduction to Classism in Germany.

He is active in the pro-feminist men's movement.

Kemper is one of the contributing editors of Agent*In. His Wikipedia nickname is Schwarze Feder.

The rightist journal Junge Freiheit has published an article on Kemper's activities in Wikipedia .

Main interests
 Alternative for Germany
 Antifeminist men's rights movement
 Classism
 Educational disadvantage

Selected works
 Klassismus (2009, with Heike Weinbach)
 (R)echte Kerle (2011)
 Die Maskulisten (2012 ed.)
 Rechte Euro-Rebellion (2013)
 Sarrazins Correctness (2014)

 Privatstädte: Labore für einen neuen Manchesterkapitalismus (2022)

References

External links

 Official website

1963 births
Living people
University of Münster alumni
People from Nordhorn
German sociologists
German male writers